Kato Nevrokopi ( "Lower Nevrokopi") is a municipality and town within that municipality in the northwest section of the Drama regional unit, Greece. Before the 2011 local government reform, it was the largest municipality in all of Greece, covering an area of 873.552 km2 (337.28 sq mi). The 2011 census reported a population of 7,860 inhabitants. The region is known for the very low temperatures during the winter and for its famous agricultural products such as potatoes and beans. The area has several features to attract tourists: the ski center of Falakro, the traditional settlement in the village of Granitis (pop. 78), the historical bunker of Lise, the artificial lakes of Lefkogeia and Potamoí, the spectacular routes in the forests, the old churches.  The forest paths offer excellent views to hikers. The largest towns are Kato Nevrokopi (the municipal seat, pop. 2,157), Volakas (1,028), Perithorio (898), Lefkogeia (465), Kato Vrontou (554), and Ochyro (514). On the territory of the municipality are located several abandoned villages, including Monastiri and Mavrochori.

History 
Under the Ottoman Empire, the village was predominantly settled by Slavs, with small numbers of Turks and Vlachs. Following the Asia Minor Catastrophe and the subsequent population exchange, it was settled by large numbers of Greek refugees from Asia Minor. On 18 April 1945, during fighting related to the Greek civil war, many Slavic Macedonian inhabitants left the area. Many of them resettled in Štip, North Macedonia.

Climate
Kato Nevrokopi has a humid continental climate. It is one of very few locations in Greece with this climate and is one of the coldest places in the country. It has cold and somewhat snowy winters and warm to hot somewhat humid summers. Precipitation tends to be balanced throughout the year, although there is a small Mediterrannean climate influence resulting in July and August being, to a small degree, drier than the rest of the year. Temperatures of -20C or below have been recorded numerous times in the past. However, there has been a warming trend in the last few years and such temperatures occur less often. Downpours and hail happen sometimes in form of showers in spring and summer. Blizzards and thick fogs in the wintertime have been reported occasionally.

Notable people
Armen Kouptsios
Theodosius Gologanov

References

External links
Official website 

Municipalities of Eastern Macedonia and Thrace
Populated places in Drama (regional unit)
Chech
Bulgaria–Greece border crossings